The Men's 10,000 metres race of the 2016 World Single Distances Speed Skating Championships was held on 11 February 2016.

Results
The race was started at 16:45.

References

Men's 10000 metres